Lake Lessing is one of the few natural lakes in Armenia. It is on the eastern slope of the Aragats mountains at 3200 m. elevation. Alpine plants make up the vegetation in the area.

The lake is about 11 km. northwest of Tsaghkashen village.

References

Lakes of Armenia
Mountain lakes
Geography of Aragatsotn Province